Aigawa Dam is a gravity dam located in Shimane Prefecture in Japan. The dam is used for power production. The catchment area of the dam is 333.2 km2. The dam impounds about 16  ha of land when full and can store 1085 thousand cubic meters of water. The construction of the dam was completed in 1942.

References

Dams in Shimane Prefecture
1942 establishments in Japan